Clavigralla is a genus of true bugs belonging to the family Coreidae.

The species of this genus are found in Africa.

Species

Species:
Clavigralla aculeata 
Clavigralla alpica 
Clavigralla andersoni

References

Coreidae